The 33rd EW Regiment is an electronic warfare unit of the Italian Army based in Treviso. Originally a unit of the army's signal arm, the regiment is today a multi-arms unit assigned to the Tactical Intelligence Brigade, which combines elements of the artillery and signal arms. The unit was formed in 1975 as a battalion, which was tasked with tactical electronic warfare operations in northeastern Italy. The battalion was named for Falzarego Pass and assigned to the V Territorial Military Command. In 1979 the battalion was transferred to the 5th Army Corps. In 1998 the 8th Signals Intelligence Battalion "Tonale" and 9th Electronic Warfare Battalion "Rombo" were disbanded and part of the two battalions tasks and personnel were transferred to the 33rd Electronic Warfare Battalion "Falzarego". In 2002 the battalion lost its autonomy and entered the newly formed 33rd EW Regiment.

History 
On 15 April 1955 the Special Signal I-RG Company was formed in Rome by the Ministry of Defense-Army Special Signal Battalion. The company was tasked with interception and radio direction finding. In 1958 the company formed a detachment in Arzene near the border with Yugoslavia. On 1 April 1959 the IX Signal Battalion was formed in Rome by expanding the Special Signal I-RG Company with personnel from the disbanded XI Signal Battalion. In 1961 the detachment in Arzene was transferred from the IX Signal Battalion to the XXXII Army Signal Battalion in Padua. The same year the detachment moved from Arzene to Latisana.

On 1 September 1964 the detachment was expanded to Mixed Company. In 15 December 1969 the company moved from Latisana to Conegliano. On 31 December 1969 the XXXII Army Signal Battalion was split to form two new battalions the next day: the XXXI Army Signal Battalion (Operations) and the XXXII Army Signal Battalion (Mixed), which retained the Mixed Company. The next day the company was renamed Mixed Electronic Warfare Company.

On 31 August 1970 the Mixed Electronic Warfare Company left the battalion and the next day it became an autonomous unit and was assigned to the V Military Territorial Command. On 5 February 1975 the company was expanded to XXXIII Electronic Warfare Battalion and consisted of a command, a command and services platoon, the 1st ESM (Electronic warfare support measures|Electronic Support Measures) Company, and the 2nd Mixed Company.

During the 1975 army reform the army disbanded the regimental level and newly independent battalions were granted for the first time their own flags. During the reform signal battalions were renamed for mountain passes. On 1 November 1975 the XXXIII Electronic Warfare Battalion was renamed 33rd Electronic Warfare Battalion "Falzarego". On 12 November 1976 the battalion was granted a flag by decree 846 of the President of the Italian Republic Giovanni Leone. The flag of the Falzarego arrived at the unit on 21 March 1976.

On 1 March 1979 the battalion was transferred to 5th Army Corps's Signal Command. On 29 June 1985 the battalion moved from Conegliano to Sacile and in 1991 the battalion moved from Sacile to Treviso. On 1 January 1996 the battalion was assigned to the Intelligence and Electronic Defense Command.

On 1 January 1998 the army disbanded the 8th Signals Intelligence Battalion "Tonale" and 9th Electronic Warfare Battalion "Rombo" and their operational tasks and the associated personnel were transferred to the 33rd Electronic Warfare Battalion "Falzarego", while their strategic and intelligence-related tasks and the associated personnel were transferred to the Italian Armed Forces' General Staff's Information and Security Department.

On 28 October 2002 the 33rd Electronic Warfare Battalion "Falzarego" lost its autonomy and the next day the battalion entered the newly formed 33rd EW Regiment as Battalion "Falzarego". On the same date the flag of the 33rd Electronic Warfare Battalion "Falzarego" was transferred from the battalion to the 32nd EW Regiment.

On 1 September 2004 the regiment was assigned to the RISTA-EW Brigade.

Current structure 
As of 2023 the 33rd EW Regiment consists of:

  Regimental Command, in Treviso
 Command and Logistic Support Company
 Battalion "Falzarego"
 1st EW Company
 2nd EW Company
 3rd EW Company
 4th EW Company

The Command and Logistic Support Company fields the following platoons: C3 Platoon, Transport and Materiel Platoon, Medical Platoon, and Commissariat Platoon.

External links
Italian Army Website: 33° Reggimento EW

References

Signal Regiments of Italy